Julian Dean Chavasse Orchard (3 March 1930, in Wheatley, Oxfordshire – 21 June 1979, in Westminster, London) was an English comedy actor. He appeared in four Carry On films: Don't Lose Your Head (1966), Follow That Camel (1967), Carry On Doctor (1967), and Carry On Henry (1971).

Career
Orchard was educated at Shrewsbury School and the Guildhall School of Music and Drama. He appeared as the flamboyant Duke of Montague, a cousin of Prince Edward, in the Cinderella film, The Slipper and the Rose (1976). He had a regular slot on Spike Milligan's The World of Beachcomber, a TV version of the "Beachcomber" pieces by J. B. Morton, appearing as the poet Roland Milk. His customary role was that of a gangling and effete – and sometimes effeminate – dandy.

He played Snodgrass  in the TV musical Pickwick for the BBC in 1969, and appeared in several of the comedy Carry On films and the sex comedy Adventures of a Private Eye (1977).

He appeared on BBC television as the "Minister for the Arts" in the episode of The Goodies entitled "Culture for the Masses"; and as one of the "mechanicals" in a production of A Midsummer Night's Dream.

He played teacher Mr Oliver Pettigrew in the TV series Whack-O! in 1971 (the role having been created by Arthur Howard in 1956–60).

He played Cornelius Button in the London Weekend Television children's serial Grasshopper Island as an eccentric grasshopper expert who had lived on Grasshopper Island for many years.

Theatre
For the 1971 Christmas season Orchard starred, with Terry Scott, as an Ugly Sister, in the London Palladium's production of Cinderella; and the following year he again played the Dame, the nurse, in the London Palladium's pantomime, Babes in the Wood.

In 1974 he became a member of the National Theatre Company at the Old Vic, appearing in Peter Hall's debut production, The Tempest. He and Arthur Lowe played the comedy duo of Stephano and Trinculo to John Gielgud's Prospero.

Death
Orchard died in hospital in Westminster, London, on 21 June 1979, following a short illness

Filmography

 The Great Van Robbery (1959) – Brady
 Three on a Spree (1961) – Walker
 Crooks Anonymous (1962) – 1st Jeweller
 Kill or Cure (1962) – PC Lofthouse
 On the Beat (1962) – Wedding Photographer (uncredited)
 A Stitch in Time (1963) – Man with Headache (uncredited)
 Father Came Too! (1964) – Bath Salesman
 Hide and Seek (1964) – Pompous Man
 Comedy Workshop: Love and Maud Carver (1964) – His Lordship / Guards Officer
 Don't Lose Your Head (1966) – Rake (uncredited)
 The Spy with a Cold Nose (1966) – Policeman 
 Stranger in the House (1967) – Policeman (uncredited)
 Follow That Camel (1967) – Doctor
 Carry On Doctor (1967) – Fred
 Half a Sixpence (1967) – Photographer
 The Magnificent Six and 1/2 (1968) – Employer
 Oliver! (1968)
 Can Heironymus Merkin Ever Forget Mercy Humppe and Find True Happiness? (1969) – Red Cardinal
 The Nine Ages of Nakedness (1969) – The Pharaoh (segment "The Egyptians")
 Futtocks End (1970) – The Twit
 Perfect Friday (1970) – Thompson
 Cucumber Castle (1970) – Julian the Lord Chamberlaine
 Carry On Henry (1971) – Duc de Poncenay
 Bless This House (1972) – Tom Hobbs
 Anoop and the Elephant (1972) – Mr. Skinner
 Man About the House (1974) – Producer
 The Adventure of Sherlock Holmes' Smarter Brother (1975) – Man in Tails
 The Slipper and the Rose (1976) – Montague
 Keep It Up Downstairs (1976) – Bishop
 Adventures of a Private Eye (1977) – Police Cyclist
 Crossed Swords (1977) – St.John
 Revenge of the Pink Panther (1978) – Hospital Clerk
 The London Connection (1979) – Driscoll

References

External links
 
 

1930 births
1979 deaths
20th-century English male actors
20th-century English comedians
Alumni of the Guildhall School of Music and Drama
English male comedians
English male film actors
English male television actors
Male actors from Oxfordshire
People educated at Shrewsbury School
People from South Oxfordshire District